was a Japanese photographer.

Ogawa visited New York City for about a year from 1967 to 1968, where he photographed on the streets. This work was posthumously collected in the book New York Is (2012).

Publications
New York Is. Tokyo: Akio Nagasawa, 2012. English and Japanese text. Edition of 1000 copies. With an essay by Ogawa (from 1968) and new essays by Nathan Lyons and Anne Wilkes Tucker. Includes a 17-minute DVD of vintage film shot by Ogawa in New York City as well as his still photographs.

References
Nihon shashinka jiten / 328 Outstanding Japanese Photographers. Kyoto: Tankōsha, 2000. .  Despite the English-language alternative title, all in Japanese.

Japanese photographers
1938 births
2008 deaths
Deaths from emphysema